The Navy Civilian Service Commendation Medal is awarded to Department of the Navy and U.S. Marine Corps civilians who distinguish themselves by performing well above that which is usually expected of an individual commensurate with his or her grade or specialty, and above the degree of excellence which can be appropriately reflected in the individual's performance evaluations, or personnel records. The medal may be awarded after a significant achievement (such as an invention, or improvement in design, procedure, or organization) or after an extended period of time (such as a deployment or overseas tour). Recipients are recognized at the equivalent level of the Navy and Marine Corps Commendation Medal awarded to military personnel for similar achievement. 

The award consists of a certificate and citation signed by the activity head, the medal on a suspension ribbon, and a lapel emblem. The award is the fourth highest Navy civilian award, ranking just behind the Navy Superior Civilian Service Award, and before the Navy Civilian Service Achievement Medal. The approval authority for the award is commanders in the rank of O-6 and above and civilians in equivalent positions and above. The earliest known medal presentation was to Bilyana Atova at Naval Support Activity Naples, Italy, Jan. 16, 2019.

Medal and ribbon description

The medal shape is a bronze hexagon. On the obverse is an eagle, perched on a horizontal anchor, with horizontally displayed wings and bearing a shield with thirteen strips and a broad band across the top. The eagle is adapted from the Navy and Marine Corps Commendation Medal, and the arrows were replaced with an anchor to denote civilian service in the Department of the Navy.

On the reverse of the medal, arched across the top, are the words "Honor Courage Commitment." In the center a stacked inscription reads "Department of the Navy Civilian Service Commendation," and at the bottom is a fouled anchor resting upon a laurel wreath. The anchor conveys service to the Navy while the laurel wreath is emblematic of achievement and honor. Together, the wreath and anchor characterize the Navy and Marine Corps core values of Honor, Courage, and Commitment.

The colors of the ribbon are myrtle green with three white stripes. These colors are consistent with the equivalent award for military service members (the Navy and Marine Corps Commendation Medal).

References

Awards and decorations of the United States Department of Defense
Awards and decorations of the United States Navy